Lilith Lorraine was the pen-name of Mary Maude Dunn Wright (March 19, 1894 — November 9, 1967) an American pulp fiction author, poet, journalist and editor.

Early life
Mary Maude Dunn was born in Corpus Christi, Texas, the daughter of John Beamond "Red" Dunn and Lelia Nias Dunn. Her father was a Texas Ranger. She attended the Incarnate Word Academy in Corpus Christi, and earned a teaching certificate at age 16. She taught in a rural Texas school as a young woman.

Career

Fiction
Lorraine's feminist utopia novelette, The Brain of the Planet, was published as a chapbook in 1929. Other stories by Lorraine included "Into the 28th Century" (Science and Wonder, 1929), a time-travel story featuring artificial wombs, eugenics, inhaled nutrition, hovercraft, and a woman as President of the United States in 1955; "The Jovian Jest" (Astounding Stories, 1930), "The Celestial Visitor" (Wonder Stories, 1935), "The Isle of Madness" (Wonder Stories, 1935), "Books Hold That Line" (1935), "Entropy" (Orb, 1952), and "Ancestors" (The Avalonian, 1952). There may be other stories of hers, under unknown pseudonyms. "Three of my pen-names are masculine," she explained to a reporter in 1965, "and if the editors and publishers knew I was a woman they wouldn't pay me more than half what they do now."

Poetry
Lorraine was an editor of poetry magazines and early zines. She published several collections of her poetry in the 1930s, 1940s, and 1950s. In the 1940s she was billed as the "founder-director of the Avalon National Poetry Shrine", later known as the Avalon World Arts Academy. In connection with Avalon, she wrote a textbook, Character against Chaos (1947). Her Wine of Wonder (1951) was billed as the first volume of science fiction poetry.

Personal life
Mary Maude Dunn married Cleveland Lamar Wright in 1912. Both Wrights died in 1967, Mary Maude a few months after her husband, in Corpus Christi. After she died, the Odessa Poetry Society named an annual prize "The Lilith Lorraine Memorial Award".

References

External links
 
 
 "Lilith Lorraine as a Fortean" From an Oblique Angle (February 10, 2015), a blogpost about the life of Mary Maude Dunn Wright, with photographs. 
 Jane Donawerth, Frankenstein's Daughters: Women Writing Science Fiction (Syracuse University Press 1997): 114. 

1894 births
1967 deaths
People from Corpus Christi, Texas
American science fiction writers
American editors
American women poets
20th-century American women writers